The Liangshan Dog is a medium-sized semi-feral scenthound originally bred by the Yi people of Liangshan Yi Prefecture in Sichuan province, China. Liangshan dogs are prized for their tracking ability, endurance and ferocity while hunting wild boar in mountainous terrain. Liangshan dogs hunt a variety of prey at variable altitudes and climates and are often deliberately underfed to improve drive to be successful.

Description 
Liangshan dogs have triangular eyes, rounded drop ears, a short, double coat and bushy curved tails. Their heads are black; however, the rest of their body is a mix of reds, yellows, and grey. It is not unusual for the hairs to be banded.

References 

Dog breeds originating in China
Yi people